The southern Titiwangsa bent-toed gecko (Cyrtodactylus australotitiwangsaensis) is a species of gecko endemic to peninsular Malaysia.

References

Cyrtodactylus
Reptiles described in 2012